The Informatics Institute of Technology (IIT) is a private higher education institute in Sri Lanka which offers specialized offshore British degree programmes in IT and Business. IIT has collaborated with leading British universities to offer undergraduate and postgraduate degree programmes in Sri Lanka since its inception in 1990.   

IIT has produced over 3000 graduates that are spread across the globe. The institute is currently located in Colombo 6 and consists of nearly 4000 students. 

The alumni of IIT have received their internal degrees from the institute through Manchester Metropolitan University, Keele University, Canterbury Christchurch University, Robert Gordon University and University of Westminster. 

IIT has received the ISO 9001:2008 quality certification.

History
The Informatics Institute of Technology (IIT) was established in 1990 under the name Informatics Institute of Computer Studies (IICS) with the objective of catering to the growing demand for ICT education. 

With the objective of catering to the demand of the growing ICT sector and to provide British higher education to the Sri Lankan youth, Chairman of the Informatics Group, Dr. Gamini Wickramasinghe took an initiative to establish IIT.

IICS which was collaborated with the Manchester Metropolitan University (MMU) was a platform which enabled Sri Lankan students to receive an internationally recognized British degree by studying in Sri Lanka at fraction of the cost of completing the degree programme in UK.

The first student body consisted of 22 students, and the original faculty of 6 was expanded to 12 for the second year. In 1994, IICS held its first convocation with former Sri Lankan President J.R. Jayawardena gracing the occasion as its guest of honour.

With a more modern ideology and with plans of expanding, in 2002 IICS was renamed as the Informatics Institute of Technology and was registered with the Board of Investment of Sri Lanka.

In 2000, IIT collaborated with the Keele University and became the pioneer in bringing the first British MSc in IT to Sri Lanka. In 2005, IIT completed the University of Westminster validation process which has endorsed undergraduate and postgraduate programmes. The University of Westminster is an acclaimed modern University having won the prestigious Queen's award for enterprise for 2 consecutive years.

In 2016, IIT partnered with Robert Gordon University to introduces Sri Lanka's first-ever MSc in Business Analytics and Fashion Business Management Masters program.

Degrees

Undergraduate programmes are offered in the disciplines of IT and Business.

 BSc (Hons) in Computer Science
 BEng (Hons) in Software Engineering
BSc(Hons) in Artificial Intelligence and Data Science
 BSc(Hons) Business Information Systems
 BA (Hons) Business Management

Postgraduate Masters Programmes

 MSc Advanced Software Engineering
 MSc Business Analytics
 MA Fashion Business Management
 MSc Big Data
 MSc Cyber Security and Forensics

Foundation programme.

 Foundation Programme

Facilities

The institute is a five floor facility which contains lecture rooms, IT Labs and tutorial rooms which are equipped with modern teaching aids. The library has a collection of over 7,000 volumes of related texts and references. The library also subscribes to academic and professional journals. All students have access to the special study rooms, conference halls, canteen and recreational facilities, including a swimming pool.

 State-of-the-art lecture rooms equipped with multimedia projectors, whiteboard and Wi-Fi
 Well stocked library with over 10,000 books and access to journals
 Access to ‘Blackboard’, the online study portal of University of Westminster
 Swimming Pool
 Sports
 Clubs
 Student Lounges
 Cafe

Awards
IIT has won many local and International Awards:

 British Council HSBC Youth Enterprise Award
 NBQSA – Silver award under the Tertiary Student category (Technology)
 Imagine Cup 2013 Worldwide Finals held on 11 July at Russia
 GLO-BUS
 e-Swabhimani award 
 First Runner up at Imagine Cup 2012
 Team ‘CR-Coderzs’ from IIT win second place at Microsoft Imagine Cup 2011
 'Gold’ for the third time in succession at NBQSA 2011
 Third place at the Motorola Inter-University Enterprise Mobility Application Software Development Competition – 2010
 Gold award in the tertiary category in NBQSA 2010
 Gold and Bronze Awards at NBQSA 2009
 Silver medal for the Tertiary Education category at  NBQSA 2005
 E-Swabhimani
 mBillionth
 APIICTA

Extra-curricular Activities 
At IIT there is a wide range of extracurricular activities offered to students. Arts and Culture are at the centre of campus life at the institute.  Stagecraft which is an annual talent show organized by the IIT Students Union displays the students’ artistic talents in song, dance and drama. Cutting Edge is another annual event organized by IIT which showcases the students’ talents in the technological field where they would come up with new concepts and display innovative ideas.  

IIT also offers several sports and student organizations which help them develop into all round graduates. The sports offered at IIT are, Cricket, Rugby, Athletics, Swimming, Netball, Basketball, Badminton, Table Tennis, Tennis, Soccer and Carom.

Clubs and Societies 
 IIT Student Union
 IIT Rotaract Club
 Mozilla Campus Club - IIT
 AIESEC
 IEEE
 IEEE WIE of IIT
 IEEECS of IIT
 Toastmasters
 Mobile Club
 Gaming Club
 iFM

Industrial Placement 
IIT provide students with a more hands-on experience by giving undergraduate students a chance to obtain work experience during the course of their degree. This comes as a mandatory one year industrial placement which will help students obtain both a degree and also the necessary work experience.

Many international and local companies have come forward to provide the necessary exposure for IIT students which have helped them to gain an insight into their respective industries as well as acquire essential skills that were vital to a successful career.

Most IIT alumni are employed in premier mercantile companies including John Keells, Unilever, Aitken Spence, IBM, Hatton National Bank, Informatics, Millenium IT, Fonterra, Zone 24 x 7, WSO2, Brandix, Industrial and Financial Systems (IFS), Commercial Bank, NDB, Vanik and Virtusa. Many of these companies participate in the annual IIT Career Day which provides Sri Lankan companies an opportunity to recruit IIT students and graduates.

Notable alumni 

 Dino Corera (Comedian)
 Bathiya Jayakody (Musician)

References

External links
 
Official Informatics Group Website
Informatics Institute of Technology (IIT), Center for Postgraduate Studies

Educational institutions established in 1990
Universities and colleges in Colombo
1990 establishments in Sri Lanka